Claremont Road is a cricket ground in Dublin, Ireland. The first recorded match held on the ground came in 1994, when Munster played North West. In local domestic cricket, the ground is the home of YMCA Cricket Club.

The ground has hosted 5 Women's One Day Internationals, the first of which came in 2005 and saw Ireland women play Australia women.  The second Women's ODI came in 2006 when Ireland women played the Netherlands women. In 2012 Ireland Women played Bangladesh and Pakistan in an ODI Tri-Series.

The ground also hosted final of 2013 ICC Women's World Twenty20 Qualifier between Pakistan and Sri Lanka. Pakistan and Sri Lanka both went on to be undefeated at the tournament, sharing the title after the final was interrupted by rain.

The ground was hosted for hosts to 2011 ICC Under-19 Cricket World Cup Qualifier.

One Day International matches

The stadium has hosted following ODI matches till date.

T20 International matches

The stadium has hosted following T20I matches till date.

References

External links
Claremont Road on CricketArchive
Claremont Road on Cricinfo

Cricket grounds in the Republic of Ireland
Sports venues in Dublin (city)
Sandymount
Sports venues completed in 1994
Cricket grounds in County Dublin
1994 establishments in Ireland